Gino Bucchino (born 1948) is the overseas member of the Italian Chamber of Deputies for North America and Central America.

Bucchino is a doctor in Toronto, Ontario, and was elected as a member of L'Unione (led by Romano Prodi).

In 2011 he claimed that President Silvio Berlusconi has attempted to bribe him into switching his party allegiance.

References

Living people
1948 births
Italian politicians
Canadian politicians of Italian descent
Place of birth missing (living people)
Canadian expatriates in Italy
Deputies of Legislature XV of Italy
Deputies of Legislature XVI of Italy